Yaël Nazé (born 1976) is a Belgian astrophysicist who works at the University of Liège. She specializes in massive stars and their interactions with their surroundings.

Biography 
She came from what she described as a poor part of Belgium where people enjoyed stargazing. At ten she considered meteorology, but by twelve became interested in astronomy. She received her PhD in March, 2004 and qualified as a permanent National Fund for Scientific Research (FNRS) researcher since 2009. She devotes part of her leisure to the popularization of sciences through conferences, animations, exhibitions, and articles. She has written several books that have earned her several awards. Her scientific work has been just as rewarded and repeatedly so.

Bibliography 
 , Vuibert, 2009
 , Belin, 2009 ( 2009) - re-edited in 2018 under the name 
 ,  Réjouisciences, 2009
 ,  Réjouisciences, 2012
 , Réjouisciences,  2012
 , Omnisciences, 2015
 , Belin, 2020

Popular works 
 In 2018, Nazé analyzed the controversy over a Ph.D. thesis proposed by a student at the University of Sfax, which defended a flat earth as well as a geocentric model of the solar system and young Earth creationism. The dissertation theme had been approved by the committee overseeing environmental studies theses (but not the final, full dissertation) and its summary had been made public and denounced in 2017 by professor Hafedh Ateb, a founder of the Tunisian Astronomical Society on his Facebook page.

Awards 
  (2009)
  (2009)
  (2014)
  (2017)

References

External links 
 Professional page of Yaël Nazé, in the place of the university of Liège
 Expert publications of Yaël Nazé, in the database ADS
 The feminine side of astronomy conference of Yaël Nazé (5 January 2010) video CERIMES / IAP.
 Conference of Yaël Nazé on the solar System (Brest, 17 October 2012)

21st-century Belgian astronomers
Academic staff of the University of Liège
Living people
21st-century women scientists
Women astronomers
1976 births